Here is a complete list of songs by the Korean girl group 4Minute.

0–9

A

B

C

D

F

G

H

I

L

M

N

P

R

S

V

W

Y

Other songs

4Minute